Robin James Cowling (born ) is an English retired rugby union player.

Career
Cowling was born in Ipswich, Suffolk, but moved to the South West as a small baby. His mother was from Gloucester, his grandfather was a former captain of Gloucester Rugby, and his uncle was John A'Bear, who toured with the British Lions in 1936.

Cowling made his Gloucester debut on October 21, 1967 as a hooker, against Newport. He quickly switched to his henceforth regular position of loosehead prop and was a regular in the side from December 1967. In 1972, Cowling started the inaugural RFU Knockout Cup Final where Gloucester beat Moseley, and the County Championship Final where Gloucestershire won their first title since 1937.  In the 1972-73 season Cowling featured in a remarkable 50 first class games, playing 45 times for Gloucester plus representative matches for Gloucestershire in the County Championship and for the combined Western Counties in their tour game against New Zealand.

Cowling moved to Market Harborough in 1974 to take a post as farm manager and joined Leicester Tigers, making his Tigers debut on September 7,1974 against Bedford. He was  reserve prop throughout the following season and went on to win eight England caps with Leicester between 1977 and 1979.  He didn't play in the John Player Cup Final against Gloucester in 1978 due to a shoulder injury sustained playing for England, but started in Leicester's three successive Cup Final wins, against Moseley in 1979, London Irish in 1980 and in his final game the 1981 Final against Gosforth. He also played for the Barbarians.

Robin Cowling has been on the Exeter Chiefs coaching staff since 1997, apart from two years with Cornish Pirates. When Don Rutherford was Rugby Football Union Technical Director, he asked Cowling to run a pilot academy scheme in the South West and he has been involved in academy rugby from the outset of the professional game. As team manager and talent scout, he has contributed substantially to the Exeter Chiefs’ current success.

References

External links
Exeter Chiefs Profile

1944 births
Living people
England international rugby union players
English rugby union coaches
English rugby union players
Leicester Tigers players
Gloucester Rugby players
Rugby union props